The 2022 United States House of Representatives elections in Colorado were held on November 8, 2022, to elect the eight U.S. representatives from the state of Colorado, one from each of the state's eight congressional districts. The elections coincided with the Colorado gubernatorial election, as well as other elections to the U.S. House of Representatives, elections to the U.S. Senate, and various state and local elections.

District boundaries were redrawn to ensure that the districts are apportioned based on data from the 2020 census, which added an eighth seat to Colorado's delegation.

Statewide results

District 1 

The 1st district includes almost all of Denver, as well as the enclaves of Glendale and Holly Hills. The district is very similar to its predecessor before 2020 redistricting. The incumbent is Democrat Diana DeGette, who was re-elected with 73.6% of the vote in 2020. She is running for re-election.

Democratic primary

Candidates

Nominee 
 Diana DeGette, incumbent U.S. Representative

Eliminated in primary 
 Neal Walia, grassroots activist and former staffer for Governor John Hickenlooper

Did not qualify  
 Dom Waters, graphic artist and educator

Endorsements

Results

Republican primary

Candidates

Nominee 
 Jennifer Qualteri

Results

General election

Predictions

Results

District 2 

The 2nd district is located in north-central Colorado, taking in Boulder, Fort Collins, and Longmont, as well as the surrounding mountain ski towns, including Vail, Grand Lake and Idaho Springs. The district was made slightly larger during redistricting, and it is now based in the north-central part of the state rather than just west of Denver. The incumbent is Democrat Joe Neguse, who was re-elected with 61.5% of the vote in 2020. He is running for re-election.

Democratic primary

Candidates

Nominee 
 Joe Neguse, incumbent U.S. Representative

Endorsements

Results

Republican primary

Candidates

Nominee 
 Marshall Dawson

Results

General election

Predictions

Results

District 3 

The 3rd district encompasses the Colorado Western Slope, including the cities of Montrose, Pueblo, and Grand Junction. Redistricting made the district slightly safer for the incumbent, Republican Lauren Boebert, who was elected with 51.4% of the vote in 2020. The district absorbs part of the old 4th district. She ran for re-election. Under the new district lines, the seat has a Cook PVI of R+7 and Donald Trump would have carried the district by 8 points. Despite this, Democrats very nearly flipped the seat, as Boebert defeated Adam Frisch by a razor-thin margin of 546 votes.

Republican primary

Candidates

Nominee 
 Lauren Boebert, incumbent U.S. Representative

Eliminated in primary 
 Don Coram, state senator from the 6th district

Eliminated at Convention 
 Marina Zimmerman, crane operator

Declined 
 Tim Foster, president of Colorado Mesa University
 Matt Soper, state representative from the 54th district (running for re-election)

Endorsements

Debates and forums

Results

Democratic primary

Candidates

Nominee 
 Adam Frisch, former Aspen city councilman

Eliminated in primary 
 Sol Sandoval, community organizer
 Alex Walker, entrepreneur

Did not qualify 
 Debby Burnett, veterinarian
 Naziha Karima In'am Hadil
 Kellie Rhodes, rancher and public servant
 Root Routledge, U.S. Air Force veteran and candidate for this seat in 2020
 Donald Valdez, state representative from the 62nd district and candidate for this seat in 2020 
 Colin Wilhelm, attorney and candidate for state house in 2020
Scott Yates

Withdrew 
 Colin Buerger
 Kerry Donovan, president pro tempore of the Colorado Senate from the 5th district
 Susan Martinez, nurse assistant and activist
 Gregg Smith, U.S. Marine Corps veteran and former adviser to Blackwater CEO Erik Prince

Declined 
 Diane Mitsch Bush, former state representative from the 26th district and nominee for this district in 2018 and 2020 (endorsed Sandoval)
 Leroy Garcia, former President of the Colorado Senate from the 3rd district
 Dylan Roberts, state representative from the 26th district (running for state senate)

Endorsements

Debates and forums

Results

Independents

Candidates

Filed paperwork
Kristin Skowronski

General election

Predictions

Endorsements

Polling 

Lauren Boebert vs. generic opponent

Results 
Republican incumbent Lauren Boebert faced a strong challenge from former Aspen city councilman and businessman Adam Frisch who led on election day. Despite many prediction sites like The Cook Political Report giving the race a rating of "Solid R" up to election day, the race would prove to become the closest race of the cycle. Nate Silver of FiveThirtyEight gave Boebert a 97% chance of winning and most projections showed Boebert defeating Frisch by a margin of nearly 15%. However, on election night, Frisch led Boebert with over 90% of votes counted. Over time the vote would narrow, with at one point Frisch leading by only 60 votes. Boebert took the lead two days after the election, though confusion would start to grow as to how many outstanding votes would be left due to military absentee ballots among other errors with vote counting. Although the close margin triggered an automatic recount, Frisch conceded the race on November 17 after all overseas, military and provisional ballots were counted, as he acknowledged that a recount was very unlikely to overturn Boebert's lead. On December 12, Secretary of State Jena Griswold announced that the results of the recount showed minimal change, with Boebert losing 3 votes and Frisch gaining 1.

District 4 

The 4th district encompasses rural eastern Colorado and the southern Denver exurbs, including Castle Rock and Parker. The incumbent is Republican Ken Buck, who was re-elected with 60.1% of the vote in 2020. The old 4th district ceded parts to the new 3rd district. Buck is running for re-election.

Republican primary

Candidates

Nominee 
 Ken Buck, incumbent U.S. Representative

Eliminated in primary 
 Bob Lewis

Endorsements

Results

Democratic primary

Candidates

Nominee 
 Ike McCorkle, U.S. Marine Corps veteran and nominee for this district in 2020

Results

Independents

Candidates

Filed paperwork
Ryan McGonigal

General election

Predictions

Results

District 5 

The 5th district is based in Colorado Springs and its suburbs, including Fountain, Black Forest, and Ellicott after previously being spread out over central Colorado. The incumbent is Republican Doug Lamborn, who was re-elected with 57.6% of the vote in 2020. He is running for re-election.

Republican primary

Candidates

Nominee
Doug Lamborn, incumbent U.S. Representative

Eliminated in primary
Andrew Heaton, business owner
Rebecca Keltie, U.S. Navy veteran and Unity nominee for this district in 2020
Dave Williams, state representative from the 15th district and former vice-chairman of the El Paso County Republican Party

Did not qualify 
Christopher Mitchell, electrical engineer

Endorsements

Results

Democratic primary

Candidates

Nominee 
 David Torres, U.S. Air Force veteran

Eliminated in primary 
Michael Colombe

Did not qualify 
Orlondo Avion
 Jeremy Dowell, attorney

Results

General election

Predictions

Results

District 6 

The 6th district is based in the southern suburbs of the Denver metropolitan area including Aurora, Centennial, and Littleton. The incumbent is Democrat Jason Crow, who was re-elected with 57.1% of the vote in 2020.

Democratic primary

Candidates

Nominee 
 Jason Crow, incumbent U.S. Representative

Endorsements

Results

Republican primary

Candidates

Nominee
Steve Monahan

Declined 
 Lora Thomas, Douglas County commissioner (running for Douglas County Sheriff)

Results

Libertarian primary

Candidates

Nominee
Eric Mulder, nominee for Arapahoe County sheriff in 2018

General election

Predictions

Results

District 7 

The 7th district includes the western suburbs of Denver and central Colorado, including Arvada, Lakewood, Broomfield, and Cañon City, but also a large portion of central Colorado. The incumbent was Democrat Ed Perlmutter, who was re-elected with 59.1% of the vote in 2020. Perlmutter announced that he would retire at the end of his term, creating an open seat.

Democratic primary

Candidates

Nominee 
 Brittany Pettersen, state senator from the 22nd district

Did not qualify 
Kyle Faust
Julius B. Mopper

Declined 
 Lesley Dahlkemper, Jefferson County commissioner
 Jessie Danielson, state senator from the 20th district (endorsed Pettersen)
 Ed Perlmutter, incumbent U.S. Representative (endorsed Pettersen)
 Brianna Titone, state representative from the 27th district (endorsed Pettersen)

Results

Republican primary

Candidates

Nominee 
 Erik Aadland, army veteran

Eliminated in primary 
 Laurel Imer, small business owner and candidate for state house in 2020
 Timothy Reichert, economist, businessman

Did not qualify 
 Carl Anderson, vice chair of the Teller County Republican Party
 Brad Dempsey, lawyer

Endorsements

Results

General election

Predictions

Endorsements

Polling 

Generic Democrat vs. generic Republican

Results

District 8 

The 8th district is a new district created after the 2020 census. It includes the northern Front Range cities and surrounding Denver communities, including Thornton, Brighton, Johnstown, and Greeley.

Democratic primary

Candidates

Nominee
Yadira Caraveo, state representative from the 31st district

Did not qualify 
Johnny Humphrey, gay rights advocate
Chaz Tedesco, Adams County commissioner

Declined
Joe Salazar, former state representative from the 31st district and candidate for Attorney General in 2018 (Running for state senate)
Brianna Titone, state representative from the 27th district (endorsed Caraveo)
Faith Winter, state senator from the 24th district (endorsed Caraveo)

Endorsements

Results

Republican primary

Candidates

Nominee 
Barbara Kirkmeyer, state senator from the 23rd district

Eliminated in primary 
Tyler Allcorn, U.S. Army Special Forces veteran
Jan Kulmann, mayor of Thornton
Lori Saine, Weld County commissioner and former state representative from the 63rd district

Did not qualify 
Ryan Gonzalez
Jewels Gray, professional photographer

Endorsements

Results

Independents

Candidates

Filed paperwork
Matthew Payette

General election

Debates and forums

Predictions

Polling 
Graphical summary

Generic Democrat vs. generic Republican

Results

Notes 

Partisan clients

References

External links 
 Colorado Secretary of State

Official campaign websites for 1st district candidates
 Diana DeGette (D) for Congress
 Jennifer Qualteri (R) for Congress

Official campaign websites for 2nd district candidates
 Marshall Dawson (R) for Congress
 Joe Neguse (D) for Congress

Official campaign websites for 3rd district candidates
 Lauren Boebert (R) for Congress
 Adam Frisch (D) for Congress

Official campaign websites for 4th district candidates
 Ken Buck (R) for Congress
 Ike McCorkle (D) for Congress

Official campaign websites for 5th district candidates
 Doug Lamborn (R) for Congress
 David Torres (D) for Congress

Official campaign websites for 6th district candidates
 Jason Crow (D) for Congress
 Steve Monahan (R) for Congress
 Eric Mulder (L) for Congress

Official campaign websites for 7th district candidates
 Erik Aadland (R) for Congress
 Brittany Pettersen (D) for Congress

Official campaign websites for 8th district candidates
 Yadira Caraveo (D) for Congress
 Barb Kirkmeyer (R) for Congress

2022
Colorado
United States House of Representatives